The Giles Cooper Awards were honours given to plays written for BBC Radio. Sponsored by the BBC and Methuen Drama, the awards were specifically focused on the script of the best radio drama produced in the past year. Five or six winners were chosen from the entire year's production of BBC drama, and published in a series of books. They were named after Giles Cooper (1918–1966), the distinguished radio dramatist who wrote over 60 scripts for BBC radio and television between 1949 and 1966.

These awards ran annually between 1978 and 1992, instigated by Richard Imison at the BBC and Geoffrey Strachan at Eyre Methuen. There was no prize money, but publication was a notable mark of permanence in the ephemeral world of broadcasting.

List of winners
1978
John Arden — Pearl (Published separately as per special arrangement with Eyre Methuen)
 Richard Harris — Is it Something I Said?
 Don Haworth — Episode on a Thursday Evening
 Jill Hyem — Remember Me
 Tom Mallin — Halt! Who Goes There?
 Jennifer Phillips — Daughters of Men
 Fay Weldon — Polaris

1979
 Shirley Gee — Typhoid Mary
 Carey Harrison — I Never Killed my German
 Barrie Keeffe — Heaven Scent
 John Kirkmorris — Coxcomb
 John Peacock — Attard in Retirement
 Olwen Wymark — The Child

1980
 Stewart Parker — Kamikaze Ground Staff Reunion Dinner
 Martyn Read — Waving to a Train
 Peter Redgrave — Martyr of the Hives
 William Trevor — Beyond the Pale

1981
 Peter Barnes — The Jumping Minuses of Byzantium 
 Don Haworth — Talk of Love and War
 Harold Pinter — Family Voices
 David Pownall — Beef
 J. P. Rooney — The Dead Image
 Paul Thain — The Biggest Sandcastle in the World

1982
 Rhys Adrian — Watching the Plays Together
 John Arden — The Old Man Sleeps Alone
 Harry Barton — Hoopoe Day
 Donald Chapman - Invisible writing
 Tom Stoppard — The Dog It Was That Died
 William Trevor — Autumn Sunshine

1983
 Wally K. Daly — Time Slip
 Shirley Gee — Never in my Lifetime
 Gerry Jones — The Angels They Grow Lonely
 Steve May — No Exceptions
 Martyn Read — Scouting for Boys

1984
 Stephen Dunstone — Who is Sylvia?
 Robert Ferguson — Transfigured Night
 Don Haworth — Daybreak Caryl Phillips — The Wasted Years Christopher Russell — Swimmer Rose Tremain — Temporary Shelter1985
 Rhys Adrian — Outpatient Barry Collins — King Canute Martin Crimp — Three Attempted Acts David Pownall — Ploughboy Monday James Saunders — Menocchio Michael Wall — Hiroshima – The Movie1986
 Robert Ferguson — Dreams, Secrets, Beautiful Lies Christina Reid — Last of a Dyin' Race Andrew Rissik — Anthony Ken Whitmore — Gingerbread House Valerie Windsor — Myths and Legacies1987
 Wally K. Daly — Mary's Frank Dunne — Dreams of Dublin Bay Anna Fox — Nobby's Day Nigel D. Moffatt — Lifetime Richard Nelson — Languages Spoken Here Peter Tinniswood — The Village Fête1988
 Terence Frisby — Just Remember Two Things: It's not Fair and Don't be Late Ken Blakeson — Excess Baggage Anthony Minghella — Cigarettes and Chocolate Rona Munro — Dirt Under the Carpet Dave Sheasby — Apple Blossom Afternoon1989
 Elizabeth Baines — Baby Buggy Jennifer Johnston — O Ananias, Azarias and Misael David Zane Mairowitz — Stalin Sonata Richard Nelson — Eating Words Craig Warner — By Where The Old Shed Used To Be1990
 Tony Bagley — The Machine David Cregan — A Butler Did It John Fletcher — Death and the Tango Tina Pepler — Song of the Forest Steve Walker — The Pope's Brother1991
 Robert Glendenning — The Words are Strange John Purser — Carver Tom Stoppard — In the Native State Steve Walker — Mickey Mookey Craig Warner — Figure with Meat''

References

External links
 Giles Cooper Awards

Awards disestablished in 1991
Awards established in 1978
British literary awards
Dramatist and playwright awards
British radio awards
BBC awards
1978 establishments in the United Kingdom
1991 disestablishments in the United Kingdom